Cham Puneh (also Romanized as Cham Pūneh; also known as Valīābād-e Cham Pūneh) is a village in Teshkan Rural District, Chegeni District, Dowreh County, Lorestan Province, Iran. At the 2006 census, its population was 20, in 5 families.

References 

Towns and villages in Dowreh County